Ophiuchus Supercluster is a nearby galaxy supercluster in the constellation Ophiuchus. The supercluster forms the far wall of the Ophiuchus Void; it may also be connected in a filament with the Pavo-Indus-Telescopium Supercluster and the Hercules Supercluster. This supercluster is centered on the cD cluster (Abell class type I) Ophiuchus Cluster, and has at least two more galaxy clusters, four more galaxy groups, and several field galaxies as members.

In February 2020, astronomers reported that a 1.5 million light-year wide cavity in the Ophiuchus Supercluster originated from the central galaxy of the Ophiuchus Cluster. The cD galaxy, NeVe 1, is the site of the Ophiuchus Supercluster eruption, triggered by the ejection of ~270 million solar masses from the supermassive black hole of NeVe 1. This may be the largest known explosion in the Universe since the Big Bang.

Discovery
Ken-ichi Wakamatsu of Gifu University and Matthew Malkan discovered Ophiuchus Cluster in 1981 on Palomar Schmidt IV-N Plates during a hidden globular cluster survey. Perhaps, determining characteristics of a supercluster will help to more correctly explain the excess velocity component of the local group of galaxies.

References

Galaxy superclusters
Ophiuchus (constellation)

Black holes